The Revised Standard Version (RSV) is an English translation of the Bible published in 1952 by the Division of Christian Education of the National Council of the Churches of Christ in the USA. This translation itself is a revision of the American Standard Version (ASV) of 1901, and was intended to be a readable and literally accurate modern English translation which aimed to "preserve all that is best in the English Bible as it has been known and used through the centuries" and "to put the message of the Bible in simple, enduring words that are worthy to stand in the great Tyndale-King James tradition."

The RSV was the first translation of the Bible to make use of the Dead Sea Scroll of Isaiah, a development considered "revolutionary" in the academic field of biblical scholarship. The New Testament was first published in 1946, the Old Testament in 1952, and the Apocrypha in 1957; the New Testament was revised in 1971. The original Revised Standard Version, Catholic Edition (RSV-CE) was published in 1965–66, and the deuterocanonical books were expanded in 1977. The Revised Standard Version, Second Catholic Edition (RSV-2CE) was released in 2006.

In later years, the RSV served as the basis for two revisions—the New Revised Standard Version (NRSV) of 1989, and the English Standard Version (ESV) of 2001.

Publication and promotion 
The immediate predecessor to the RSV was the American Standard Version (ASV), published in 1901 by Thomas Nelson & Sons, and copyrighted to protect the ASV text from unauthorized changes. In 1928, the International Council of Religious Education (ICRE) acquired the copyright to the ASV from Nelson and renewed it the following year.

From 1930 to 1932, a study of the ASV text was undertaken to decide the question of a new revision, but due to the Great Depression, it was not until 1937 that the ICRE voted in favor of revising the ASV text. A panel of 32 scholars was assembled for that task. Also, the Council hoped to set up a corresponding translation committee in Great Britain, as had been the case with the RV and ASV, but this plan was canceled because of World War II.

Funding for the revision was assured in 1936 by a deal made with the publisher Thomas Nelson & Sons that gave Nelson the exclusive rights to print the new version for ten years. The Committee determined that, since the work would be a revision of the "Standard Bible" (as the ASV was sometimes called because of its standard use in seminaries in those days), the name of the work would be the "Revised Standard Version".

The translation panel used the 17th edition of the Nestle-Aland Greek text for the New Testament and the traditional Hebrew Masoretic Text for the Old Testament. In the Book of Isaiah, they sometimes followed readings found in the newly discovered Dead Sea Scrolls.

The RSV New Testament was published on February 11, 1946, with a ceremony commemorating its publication held in Columbus, Ohio. In his presentation speech to the ICRE, Luther Weigle, dean of the translation committee, explained that he wanted the RSV to supplement and not supplant the KJV and ASV.

In 1950, the ICRE merged with the Federal Council of Churches to form the National Council of the Churches of Christ in the USA. The former ICRE became the new Council's Division of Christian Education, and the NCC became the RSV's official sponsor. After a thorough examination and approximately 80 changes to the New Testament text, the NCC authorized the RSV Bible for publication in 1951. St. Jerome's Day, September 30, 1952, was selected as the day of publication.

The NCC launched a massive marketing campaign aimed at promoting the new version, proclaiming it to be "The Greatest Bible News in 341 Years" and hailing "The Word of Life in Living Language". The week of September 28-October 5, 1952 was declared to be "Revised Standard Version Bible Observance Week", with festivities planned for the occasion.

A number of specially bound presentation copies were given to local public officials in the days prior to the general release. One such presentation copy, the very first copy of the RSV Bible to come off the press, was presented by Weigle to an appreciative President Harry S. Truman on September 26, four days before it was released to the general public.

On September 30, the RSV Bible was released to the general public. The NCC sponsored a celebratory rally in Washington D.C., with representatives of the churches affiliated with it present. A total of 3,418 interdenominational religious gatherings across North America were held that evening to honor the new version and the translators who made it possible.

In its original publication by Nelson, the Revised Standard Version appeared in three editions: A maroon buckram hardcover edition, a black genuine leather edition, and a three-volume set bound in blue hardcover.

Features 

There are four key differences between the RSV and its three direct predecessors (the KJV, RV and ASV):

 The translators reverted to the KJV and RV's practice of translating the Tetragrammaton, or the Divine Name, YHWH. In accordance with the 1611 and 1885 versions, the RSV translated it as "" or "" (depending on whether the Hebrew of the particular verse was read "Adonai" or "Elohim" in Jewish practice), whereas the ASV had translated it "Jehovah".
 A change was made in the usage of second-person pronouns. The KJV, RV and ASV use the pronouns thou, thee, thy and thine to translate all instances of the second-person singular in the original languages, alongside their associated verb forms (such as art, hast, hadst and didst). The pronoun you and its related forms are used in these translations only to translate the plural. In contrast, the RSV uses only the you forms regardless of number, retaining the older singular thou forms only in address to God (a fairly common practice for Bible translations until the 1970s).
 The RSV is the first direct revision of the KJV to significantly modernize the language used; for example, the verb ending -eth is replaced by the more contemporary -s to indicate the third-person singular present, some archaic past tense forms such as spake and sware are updated to their modern counterparts (spoke and swore), and the original case distinction between ye and you is removed (the latter being favoured in both nominative and objective cases).
 For the New Testament, the RSV followed the latest available version of Nestle's Greek text, whereas the RV and ASV had used the Westcott and Hort Greek text, and the KJV had used the Textus receptus.

Reception and controversy

Isaiah 7:14 dispute and impact 

The RSV New Testament was well received, but reactions to the Old Testament were varied and not without controversy. Critics claimed that the RSV translators had translated the Old Testament from a non-Christian perspective. Some critics specifically referred to a Jewish viewpoint, pointing to agreements with the 1917 Jewish Publication Society of America Version Tanakh and the presence on the editorial board of a Jewish scholar, Harry Orlinsky. Such critics further claimed that other views, including those regarding the New Testament, were not considered. The focus of the controversy was the RSV's translation of the Hebrew word  (ʿalmāh) in Isaiah 7:14 as "young woman."

Almah in Hebrew translates as a young woman of childbearing age who had not had children, and so may or may not be a virgin. The Greek language Septuagint written one hundred to three hundred years before Jesus rendered almah as parthenos (παρθένος), which translates as "virgin", and this is the understanding carried over by Christians.

Of the seven appearances of ʿalmāh, the Septuagint translates only two of them as parthenos, "virgin" (including Isaiah 7:14). By contrast, the word  (bəṯūlāh) appears some 50 times, and the Septuagint and English translations agree in understanding the word to mean "virgin" in almost every case.

The controversy stemming from this rendering helped reignite the King-James-Only Movement within the Independent Baptist and Pentecostal churches. Furthermore, many Christians have adopted what has come to be known as the "Isaiah 7:14 litmus test", which entails checking that verse to determine whether or not a new translation can be trusted.

Protest 
Some opponents of the RSV took their antagonism beyond condemnation. Luther Hux, a pastor in Rocky Mount, North Carolina, announced his intention to burn a copy of the RSV during a sermon on November 30, 1952. This was reported in the press and attracted shocked reactions, as well as a warning from the local fire chief. On the day in question, he delivered a two-hour sermon entitled "The National Council Bible, the Master Stroke of Satan—One of the Devil's Greatest Hoaxes". After ending the sermon, he led the congregation out of the church, gave each worshipper a small American flag and proceeded to set light to the pages containing Isaiah 7:14. Hux informed the gathered press that he did not burn the Bible, but simply the "fraud" that the Isaiah pages represented. Hux later wrote a tract against the RSV entitled Modernism's Unholy Bible. Another pastor in the Southern United States burned a copy of the RSV with a blowlamp in his pulpit, saying that it was like the devil because it was hard to burn and sent the ashes as a protest to Weigle.

The RSV translators linked these events to the life of William Tyndale, an inspiration to them, explaining in their preface: "He met bitter opposition. He was accused of willfully perverting the meaning of the Scriptures, and his New Testaments were ordered to be burned as 'untrue translations.'" But where Tyndale was strangled and then burned at the stake for his work, Bruce Metzger, referring to the pastor who burned the RSV and sent the ashes to Weigle, commented in his book The Bible In Translation: "...today it is happily only a copy of the translation that meets such a fate." instead of Bible translators.

Post-1952 developments

Apocrypha 
In 1957, at the request of the Episcopal Church in the United States of America, the deuterocanonical books (included in the Apocrypha by most Protestant Christians) were added to the RSV. Since there was no American Standard Version of the Apocrypha, the RSV Apocrypha was a revision of the Revised Version Apocrypha of 1894 as well as the King James Version. To make the RSV acceptable to individuals and parishes within the Eastern Orthodox Church, an expanded edition of the deuterocanonical texts containing 3 and 4 Maccabees and Psalm 151 was released in 1977; in these 1977 additions, as in the New Revised Standard Version, archaic pronouns (such as "thou" and "thee") and verb forms (such as "hast" and "didst") are no longer used for God.

Most editions of the RSV that contain the Apocrypha place those books after the New Testament, arranged in the order of the King James Version (the Eastern Orthodox deuterocanon in post-1977 editions is added at the end). The exceptions are the First and Second Catholic Editions and the Common Bible in which the Apocryphal books were placed in the order of the Roman Catholic Biblical canon and between the Testaments and rearranged in an order pleasing to Catholics, Orthodox, and Protestants alike, respectively (see below for more information about the Catholic Editions and the Common Bible).

Alterations in 1962 printings 

Approximately 85 alterations to the RSV text were authorized in 1959 and introduced into the 1962 printings. At the same time, as Thomas Nelson & Sons was not keeping up with the public demand for the RSV Bible, the NCC authorized other publishing companies besides Nelson to print it, including the American Bible Society, Cokesbury, Holman, Melton, Oxford University Press, World, Collins, and Zondervan. Some of the changes included (but were not limited to) reverting to the Greek phrase "the husband of one wife" in 1 Timothy 3.2, 12 and Titus 1.6 (in the 1946-52 printing it was paraphrased as "married only once"), quoting the Roman centurion  who witnessed Jesus' death and called him "the Son of God" in Matthew 27.54 and Mark 15.39 (in 1946-52 he was quoted as calling Jesus "a son of God"), and changing "without" in Job 19.26 to "from" (and adjusting the associated footnote accordingly).

Catholic Edition 

In 1965–66, the Catholic Biblical Association adapted, under the editorship of John Archibald Henslowe Orchard O.S.B. and Reginald C. Fuller, the RSV for Catholic use with the release of the Revised Standard Version Catholic Edition (RSV-CE). A revised New Testament was published in 1965, followed by a full RSV Catholic Edition Bible in 1966. The RSV Catholic Edition included revisions up through 1962, a small number of new revisions to the New Testament, mostly to return to familiar phrases, and changes to a few footnotes. It contains the deuterocanonical books of the Old Testament placed in the traditional order of the Vulgate.

Second Edition of the New Testament 
On March 15, 1971, the RSV Bible was re-released with the Second Edition of the Translation of the New Testament. Whereas in 1962 the translation panel had merely authorized a handful of changes, in 1971 they gave the New Testament text a thorough editing. This Second Edition incorporated Greek manuscripts not previously available to the RSV translation panel, namely, the Bodmer Papyri, published in 1956–61.

The most obvious changes were the restoration of Mark 16.9-20 (the long ending) and John 7.53-8.11 aka The Pericope Adulterae (in which Jesus forgives an adultress) to the text (in 1946, they were put in footnotes). Also restored was Luke 22.19b-20, containing the bulk of Jesus' institution of the Lord's Supper. In the 1946-52 text, this had been cut off at the phrase, "This is my body", and the rest had only been footnoted, since this verse did not appear in the original Codex Bezae manuscript used by the translation committee.

The description of Christ's ascension in Luke 24:51 had the footnote "...and was carried up into heaven" restored to the text. Luke 22.43-44, which had been part of the text in 1946–52, was relegated to the footnote section because of its questionable authenticity; in these verses an angel appears to Jesus in Gethsemane to strengthen and encourage Him before His arrest and crucifixion. Many other verses were rephrased or rewritten for greater clarity and accuracy. Moreover, the footnotes concerning monetary values were no longer expressed in terms of dollars and cents but in terms of how long it took to earn each coin (e. g., the denarius was no longer defined as twenty cents but as a day's wage). The Book of Revelation, called "The Revelation to John" in the previous editions, was retitled "The Revelation to John (The Apocalypse)".

Some of these changes to the RSV New Testament had already been introduced in the 1965-66 RSV Catholic Edition, and their introduction into the RSV itself was done to pave the way for the publication of the Common Bible in 1973.

The Standard Bible Committee intended to prepare a second edition of the Old Testament, but those plans were scrapped in 1974, when the National Council of Churches voted to authorize a full revision of the RSV.

Common Bible 
The Common Bible of 1973 ordered the books in a way that pleased both Catholics and Protestants. It was divided into four sections: 
 The Old Testament (39 Books)
 The Catholic Deuterocanonical Books (12 Books)
 The additional Eastern Orthodox Deuterocanonical Books (three Books; six Books after 1977)
 The New Testament (27 Books)

The non-deuterocanonicals gave the Common Bible a total of 81 books: it included 1 Esdras (also known as 3 Ezra), 2 Esdras (4 Ezra), and the Prayer of Manasseh, books that have appeared in the Vulgate's appendix since Jerome's time "lest they perish entirely", but are not considered canonical by Catholics and are thus not included in most modern Catholic Bibles.

In 1977, the RSV Apocrypha was expanded to include 3 Maccabees, 4 Maccabees, and Psalm 151, three additional sections accepted in the Eastern Orthodox canon (4 Maccabees again forming an appendix in that tradition), although it still does not include additional books in the Syriac and Ethiopian canons. This action increased the Common Bible to 84 Books, making it the most comprehensive English Bible translation to date with its inclusion of books not accepted by all denominations. The goal of the Common Bible was to help ecumenical relations among the churches.

Reader's Digest Bible 
In 1982, Reader's Digest published a special edition of the RSV that was billed as a condensed edition of the text. A team of seven editors led by John Evangelist Walsh produced the manuscript. The Reader's Digest edition was intended for those who did not read the Bible or who read it infrequently; it was not intended as a replacement of the full RSV text. In this version, 55% of the Old Testament and 25% of the New Testament were cut. Familiar passages such as the Lord's Prayer, Psalm 23, and the Ten Commandments were retained. For those who wanted the full RSV, Reader's Digest provided a list of publishers that sold the complete RSV at that time.

Second Catholic Edition 
In early 2006, Ignatius Press released the Revised Standard Version, Second Catholic Edition (RSV-2CE). This second edition removed archaic pronouns (thee, thou), and accompanying verb forms (didst, speakest), revised passages used in the lectionary according to the Vatican document Liturgiam authenticam, and elevated some passages out of the RSV footnotes when they favored Catholic renderings, such as replacing "young woman" with "virgin" in Isaiah 7:14.

Revisions

New Revised Standard Version 

In 1989, the National Council of Churches released a full-scale revision to the RSV called the New Revised Standard Version (NRSV). It was the first major version to use gender-neutral language and thus drew more criticism and ire from conservative Christians than did its 1952 predecessor. This criticism largely stemmed from concerns that the modified language obscured phrases in the Old Testament that could be read as messianic prophecies.

English Standard Version 

In 2001, Crossway published the English Standard Version (ESV), its revision of the 1971 text edition of the RSV. In comparison to the RSV, the ESV reverts certain disputed passages to their prior rendering as found in the ASV. Unlike the NRSV, the ESV, depending on the context, prefers to use gender-inclusive language sparingly.

Legacy and use today 
When the New Revised Standard Version (NRSV) was released in 1989, some traditional Christians — both Catholic and Protestant — criticized its wide use of gender-inclusive language. Because of its significance in the development of the English Bible tradition, many publishers and Biblical scholars continue to rely on the RSV tradition in their work, especially when writing for mixed Catholic and Protestant audiences:

The year 2002 marked the 50th anniversary of the RSV Bible's first publication. Oxford University Press commemorated it by releasing two different Anniversary editions: one with the Old and New Testaments only (with the NT text from 1971), and another including the Apocryphal books as seen in the 1977 Expanded Edition. In an effort to further ecumenical relations, the more extensive 50th Anniversary Edition also included some of the preferred Catholic readings in the text and footnotes of the New Testament section.

Moreover, because of its importance to Anglican heritage and the English Bible tradition, the Revised Standard Version, Second Catholic Edition (RSV-2CE) has been approved for liturgical use in Anglican Use Catholic parishes of the U.S. Pastoral Provision and Personal Ordinariates for former Anglicans around the world. The Personal Ordinariate of Our Lady of Walsingham in the United Kingdom has adopted the RSV-2CE as "the sole lectionary authorized for use" in its liturgies.Liturgy - Anglican Use - Personal Ordinariate of Our Lady of Walsingham The RSV is one of the versions authorized to be used in services of the Episcopal Church and the Anglican Communion.

On January 20, 2017, incoming U.S. President Donald Trump took his inaugural oath of office using a copy of the RSV Bible given to him by his mother in 1955 when he graduated from a Presbyterian Sunday School.

Documentary 
In 1999, the National Council of Churches, in association with Odyssey Productions, produced a TV documentary about the making of the RSV — The Bible Under Fire.

Notes

References

Further reading 
 Marlowe, Michael D. (2001). "Revised Standard Version (1946-1977)". Retrieved July 21, 2003.
 May, Herbert Gordon (1952). Our English Bible In The Making. Philadelphia: Westminster Press.
 Metzger, Bruce (2001). The Bible in Translation. Grand Rapids: Baker Academic. 
 Rhodes, Ron (2009). The Complete Guide to Bible Translations. Eugene: Harvest House Publishers. 
 Sheely, Steven and Robert Nash (1999). Choosing A Bible. Nashville: Abdington Press. 
 Thuesen, Peter (1999). In Discordance with the Scriptures: American Protestant Battles over Translating the Bible. New York: Oxford University Press.

External links 
 A Critique of the Revised Standard Version from Bibliotheca Sacra Volume 110 (Jan. 1953) pp. 50–66. A contemporary review of the newly published RSV by the faculty of Dallas Theological Seminary
 LIFE 20 Oct. 1952 LIFE Magazine article about RSV release.
 RSV Preface
 RSV text online; searchable
 The Bible Under Fire A video documentary on the history of the RSV and NRSV translations
 The Revised Standard Version (1946-1977) – some history from a privately run web site.

1952 books
1952 in Christianity
Bible translations into English